Thusith de Soysa (born 8 June 1998) is a Sri Lankan cricketer. He made his List A debut for Kurunegala Youth Cricket Club in the 2017–18 Premier Limited Overs Tournament on 10 March 2018.

References

External links
 

1998 births
Living people
Sri Lankan cricketers
Kurunegala Youth Cricket Club cricketers
Place of birth missing (living people)